Atlantic Superstore is a Canadian supermarket chain. The chain operates 54 stores in the Maritimes of Nova Scotia, New Brunswick, and Prince Edward Island. It is owned by George Weston Limited through Loblaw Companies Limited, and operates under the Atlantic Wholesalers division of Loblaws.

The stores range in from 45,000 to over 120,000 square feet (4,000 to over 10,000 m²) in size.

Store services
Despite the similarity in name to sister chain Real Canadian Superstore, not all Atlantic Superstores are hypermarkets: many are large supermarkets with little general merchandise. Others, however, are marketed as "one stop" stores (much like Real Canadian Superstore) and carry a wide variety of goods, including groceries, electronics, housewares, clothing, and generally offer services such as photo finishing and a pharmacy.

Some larger stores (60,000 to over 80,000 square feet) also have a community room, drive-through pharmacy, Mobil gas bar, liquor store (operated by the applicable provincial agency), tobacco shop, and walk-in medical clinics.

Atlantic Superstore has added self checkout registers at its larger stores which allow customers to scan the barcode of an item and make payment without any interaction with store employees.

Starting on April 22, 2009, some locations began charging 5 cents per plastic bag at checkouts, to promote the use of environmentally friendly reusable bags. On March 1, 2010 this practice was stopped. However, at least one location is "bagless" meaning that it has phased out disposable plastic bags entirely, requiring customers to either bring their own means of carrying their purchases, or else buy in-store reusable fabric bags.

In December 2017, click and collect, under the PC Express banner began in Atlantic Canada, starting with Atlantic Superstore locations in Halifax.

History
Loblaw entered Atlantic Canada through the acquisition of Atlantic Wholesalers, owner of the SaveEasy chain, in 1976.

In 1986, the company opened its first large-scale grocery store in Moncton, New Brunswick, using the name The Real Atlantic Superstore. In 1995 the name was shortened to the present one and the store designs were reformatted to the "market style" with the slogan "Low Prices and More!" Most SaveEasy stores, excluding those in rural areas, were eventually converted to the SuperValu or Superstore format, either through renovation or relocation.

During the 1990s, the company's headquarters were relocated from Sackville to Dartmouth, Nova Scotia.  New warehousing facilities for just in time logistics distribution were built, and a huge expansion campaign brought new large-format stores to many centres in the region within a period of only several years. In the early 2000s, a marketing campaign was introduced to the superstores, changing their slogan to "Eat Well, Spend Less". This was similar to a campaign carried out in Loblaws stores in Ontario. With the arrival of the Real Canadian Superstore concept in Ontario, Atlantic Superstore used a similar marketing campaign with the slogan "Prices You Can Trust". This concept was used until 2009 when the "Just Lower Prices" campaign was launched.

Some Atlantic Superstore locations will be switched to No Frills depending on the stores demographic.

See also
List of supermarkets

External links
 Atlantic Superstore Official website

Loblaw Companies
Supermarkets of Canada
Companies based in Halifax, Nova Scotia
Retail companies established in 1986
1986 establishments in Nova Scotia
Canadian companies established in 1986
Cuisine of Atlantic Canada